Jackpot is a 1960 British crime film directed by Montgomery Tully and starring William Hartnell, Betty McDowall and Eddie Byrne.

Plot
An ex-convict learns that his wife is not willing to return to him. He and an accomplice rob the safe in 'The Jackpot Club'. The police and the owner of the club want to track down the robbers.

Cast
 William Hartnell as Superintendent Frawley
 Betty McDowall as Kay Stock
 Eddie Byrne as Sam Hare
 George Mikell as Carl Stock
 Michael Ripper as Lenny Lane
 Victor Brooks as Sergeant Jacks
 Tim Turner as Peter
 Mike Sarne dancer in Lenny's snack bar
 Sylvia Davies As Sally (waitress in Lennys cafe)

References

External links

1960 films
1960s English-language films
1960 crime films
British crime films
Films directed by Montgomery Tully
1960s British films